Johnny Antonio Taylor (born June 4, 1974) is an American former basketball player who is currently an assistant coach for the Lakeland Magic.

Before his coaching career, Taylor played college basketball at the University of Tennessee - Chattanooga, earning So-Con Player of the Year Honors in 1997. Taylor went on to be the 17th overall pick in the 1997 NBA draft, playing for the Orlando Magic and Denver Nuggets during his NBA tenure. In 2000, Taylor continued his professional career overseas, playing with teams in Italy, Philippines, Russia, South Korea, Spain, Lebanon, Belgium, Japan, Bahrain, and the United Arab Emirates until he retired in 2012.

Coaching career
Previously he served as the Player Development Coach for the VCU Men's Basketball team in Richmond, Virginia.

References

External links
Official NBA.com player profile
NBA stats @ basketballreference.com

1974 births
Living people
American expatriate basketball people in Belgium
American expatriate basketball people in Italy
American expatriate basketball people in Japan
American expatriate basketball people in Lebanon
American expatriate basketball people in Russia
American expatriate basketball people in South Korea
American expatriate basketball people in Spain
American expatriate basketball people in the Philippines
American expatriate basketball people in the United Arab Emirates
American expatriate sportspeople in Bahrain
American men's basketball players
Basketball coaches from Tennessee
Basketball players from Tennessee
BC Zenit Saint Petersburg players
Belfius Mons-Hainaut players
Suwon KT Sonicboom players
CB Lucentum Alicante players
Chattanooga Mocs men's basketball players
Denver Nuggets players
Indian Hills Warriors basketball players
Knoxville Bulldogs men's basketball players
Lakeland Magic coaches
Liga ACB players
Nagoya Diamond Dolphins players
Olimpia Milano players
Orlando Magic draft picks
Orlando Magic players
PBC Lokomotiv-Kuban players
Philippine Basketball Association imports
Roanoke Dazzle players
Small forwards
Sportspeople from Chattanooga, Tennessee
Sta. Lucia Realtors players